Ellis Congregational Church is a church at Eighth and Washington Streets in Ellis, Kansas.  It was built in 1907-08 and added to the National Register of Historic Places in 2000.

It is a one-and-a-half-story Gothic Revival-style structural limestone course with a woodframe hipped roof.

It served as a church for 65 years, until the congregation disbanded in 1963, and was later converted into a community center.  As of 1998 it served as meeting place for the Ellis Arts and Historical Society.

References

External links

Churches on the National Register of Historic Places in Kansas
Gothic Revival church buildings in Kansas
Churches completed in 1907
Churches in Ellis County, Kansas
National Register of Historic Places in Ellis County, Kansas